Tianjiazhai (Mandarin: 田家寨镇) is a town in Huangzhong District, Xining, Qinghai, China. In 2010, Tianjiazhai had a total population of 38,229: 20,272 males and 17,957 females: 8,042 aged under 14, 27,540 aged between 15 and 65 and 2,647 aged over 65.

References 
 

Township-level divisions of Qinghai
Xining
Towns in China